Arthur Marsden may refer to:

 Arthur Marsden (cricketer) (1880–1916), English cricketer who played first-class cricket for Derbyshire in 1910
 Arthur Marsden (politician) (1883–1960), British Conservative Party politician, Member of Parliament, 1931–1935 and 1937–1950 
 John Marsden (rower) (Arthur John Marsden, 1915–2004), English rower